John Harris (21 November 1825 – 24 July 1886) was a New Zealand cricketer. He played one first-class match for Otago in 1865/66.

See also
 List of Otago representative cricketers

References

External links
 

1825 births
1886 deaths
New Zealand cricketers
Otago cricketers
Sportspeople from Oxfordshire